Islam is the largest and the state religion of the Islamic Republic of Pakistan. As much as 90% of the population follows Sunni Islam. Most Pakistani Sunni Muslims belong to the Hanafi school of jurisprudence, which is represented by the Barelvi and Deobandi traditions. According to some estimates, the Barelvi school of thought makes up 50-60% of the Muslim population of Pakistan, and Deobandis 15-20%, but some source says that Deobandis are majority and there are more madrasas (Islamic seminaries) of the Deobandi   doctrine than of the Barelvi.  Muhammad Zia-ul-Haq, who was also a follower of the Deobandi school of thought, prioritized the implementation of Sunni policies and laws that were in line with Deobandi beliefs during his attempts at the Islamization of Pakistan.

Pakistan has been called a "global centre for political Islam". Pakistani nationalist narrative is based on the idea that Muslims of the Subcontinent are an independent nation with their own distinctive outlook on life that is different from the rest of subcontinent.

Islam in Pakistan existed in communities along the Arab coastal trade routes in Sindh as soon as the religion originated and had gained early acceptance in the Arabian Peninsula. The connection between Sindh and Islam was established by the initial Muslim missions during the Rashidun Caliphate. Al-Hakim ibn Jabalah al-Abdi, who attacked Makran in the year 649 CE, was an Army officer of Caliph Ali. During the Caliphate of Ali, many Hindus of Sindh had come under influence of Islam and some even participated in the Battle of Camel and died fighting for Ali. Under the Umayyads (661–750 CE), many Shias sought asylum in the region of Sindh, to live in relative peace in the remote area. Ziyad Hindi is one of those refugees. In 712 CE, a young Arab general Muhammad bin Qasim conquered most of the Indus region for the Caliphal empire, to be made the "As-Sindh" province with its capital at Al-Mansurah. By the end of the 10th century CE, the region was ruled by several Hindu Shahi kings who would be subdued by the Ghaznavids.

About 97% of Pakistanis are Muslims. Pakistan has the second largest number of Muslims in the world after Indonesia. The majority are Sunni (85-90%) while Shias make up between 10% to 15%. However, the Hanbali school is gaining popularity recently due to Wahhabi influence from the Middle East. Smaller minority Muslim populations in Pakistan include Quranists, nondenominational Muslims. There are also two Mahdi'ist based creeds practiced in Pakistan, namely Mahdavia and Ahmadis, the latter of whom are considered by the constitution of Pakistan to be non-Muslims, constitute 1% of the Muslim population. Pakistan has the world's largest Muslim majority city (Karachi).

Islam before the creation of Pakistan

The connection between the Indus Valley and Islam was established by the initial Muslim missions. According to Derryl N. Maclean, a link between Sindh and early partisans of Ali or proto-Shi'ites can be traced to Hakim ibn Jabalah al-Abdi, a companion of the Islamic prophet Muhammad, who traveled across Sind to Makran in the year 649AD and presented a report on the area to the Caliph. He supported Ali, and died in the Battle of the Camel alongside Sindhi Jats. He was also a poet and a few couplets of his poem in praise of Ali ibn Abu Talib have survived, as reported in Chachnama:

During the reign of Ali, many Jats came under the influence of Islam. Harith ibn Murrah Al-abdi and Sayfi ibn Fil' al-Shaybani, both officers of Ali's army, attacked Sindhi bandits and chased them to Al-Qiqan (present-day Quetta) in the year 658. Sayfi was one of the seven partisans of Ali who were beheaded alongside Hujr ibn Adi al-Kindi in 660AD, near Damascus.

The Arab conqueror Muhammad bin Qasim conquered Sindh in 711 CE. The Pakistan government's official chronology claims this as the time when the foundation of Pakistan was laid. The Early Medieval period (642–1219 CE) witnessed the spread of Islam in the region. During this period, Sufi missionaries played a pivotal role in converting a majority of the regional Buddhist and Hindu population to Islam. These developments set the stage for the rule of several successive Muslim empires in the region, including the Ghaznavid Empire (975–1187 CE), the Ghorid Kingdom, and the Delhi Sultanate (1206–1526 CE). The Lodi dynasty, the last of the Delhi Sultanate, was replaced by the Mughal Empire (1526–1857 CE).

Islam in independent Pakistan

Nature of state
The Muslim League leadership, ulama (Islamic clergy) and Jinnah had articulated their vision of Pakistan in terms of an Islamic state. Muhammad Ali Jinnah had developed a close association with the ulama. When Jinnah died, Islamic scholar Maulana Shabbir Ahmad Usmani described Jinnah as the greatest Muslim after the Mughal Emperor Aurangzeb and also compared Jinnah's death to the Muhammad's passing. Usmani asked Pakistanis to remember Jinnah's message of Unity, Faith and Discipline and work to fulfil his dream:to create a solid bloc of all Muslim states from Karachi to Ankara, from Pakistan to Morocco. He [Jinnah] wanted to see the Muslims of the world united under the banner of Islam as an effective check against the aggressive designs of their enemies.The first formal step taken to transform Pakistan into an ideological Islamic state was in March 1949 when the country's first Prime Minister, Liaquat Ali Khan, introduced the Objectives Resolution in the Constituent Assembly. The Objectives Resolution declared that sovereignty over the entire universe belongs to God Almighty. The president of the Muslim League, Chaudhry Khaliquzzaman, announced that Pakistan would bring together all Muslim countries into Islamistan-a pan-Islamic entity. Khaliq believed that Pakistan was only a Muslim state and was not yet an Islamic state, but that it could certainly become an Islamic state after bringing all believers of Islam into a single political unit. Keith Callard, one of the earliest scholars on Pakistani politics, observed that Pakistanis believed in the essential unity of purpose and outlook in the Muslim world:Pakistan was founded to advance the cause of Muslims. Other Muslims might have been expected to be sympathetic, even enthusiastic. But this assumed that other Muslim states would take the same view of the relation between religion and nationality.However, Pakistan's pan-Islamist sentiments were not shared by other Muslim governments at the time. Nationalism in other parts of the Muslim world was based on ethnicity, language and culture. Although Muslim governments were unsympathetic with Pakistan's pan-Islamic aspirations, Islamists from all over the world were drawn to Pakistan. Figures such as the Grand Mufti of Palestine, Al-Haj Amin al-Husseini, and leaders of Islamist political movements, such as the Muslim Brotherhood, became frequent visitors to the country. After General Zia-ul-Haq took power in a military coup, Hizb ut-Tahrir (an Islamist group calling for the establishment of a Caliphate) expanded its organisational network and activities in Pakistan. Its founder, Taqi al-Din al-Nabhani, would maintain regular correspondence with Abul A’la Maududi, the founder of Jamaat-e-Islami (JI), and he also urged Dr. Israr Ahmed to continue his work in Pakistan for the establishment of a global caliphate.

Social scientist Nasim Ahmad Jawed conducted a survey in 1969 in pre-divided Pakistan on the type of national identity that was used by educated professional people. He found that over 60% of people in East Pakistan (modern day Bangladesh) professed to have a secular national identity. However, in West Pakistan (current day Pakistan) the same figure professed to have an Islamic and not a secular identity. Furthermore, the same figure in East Pakistan defined their identity in terms of their ethnicity and not Islam. It was the opposite in West Pakistan, where Islam was stated to be more important than ethnicity.

After Pakistan's first ever general elections the 1973 Constitution was created by an elected Parliament. The Constitution declared Pakistan an Islamic Republic and Islam as the state religion. It also stated that all laws would have to be brought into accordance with the injunctions of Islam as laid down in the Quran and Sunnah and that no law repugnant to such injunctions could be enacted. The 1973 Constitution also created certain institutions such as the Shariat Court and the Council of Islamic Ideology to channel the interpretation and application of Islam.

Zia ul Haq's Islamization

On 5 July 1977, General Zia-ul-Haq led a coup d'état. In the year or two before Zia-ul-Haq's coup, his predecessor, leftist Prime Minister Zulfikar Ali Bhutto, had faced vigorous opposition which was united under the revivalist banner of Nizam-e-Mustafa ("Rule of the prophet"). According to supporters of the movement, establishing an Islamic state based on sharia law would mean a return to the justice and success of the early days of Islam when Muhammad ruled the Muslims. In an effort to stem the tide of street Islamisation, Bhutto had also called for it and banned the drinking and selling of wine by Muslims, nightclubs and horse racing.

"Islamisation" was the "primary" policy,
or "centerpiece" of his government. Zia-ul-Haq committed himself to establishing an Islamic state and enforcing sharia law. Zia established separate Shariat judicial courts and court benches to judge legal cases using Islamic doctrine. New criminal offences (of adultery, fornication, and types of blasphemy), and new punishments (of whipping, amputation, and stoning to death), were added to Pakistani law. Interest payments for bank accounts were replaced by "profit and loss" payments. Zakat charitable donations became a 2.5% annual tax. School textbooks and libraries were overhauled to remove un-Islamic material.  Offices, schools, and factories were required to offer praying space. Zia bolstered the influence of the ulama (Islamic clergy) and the Islamic parties, whilst conservative scholars became fixtures on television. 10,000s of activists from the Jamaat-e-Islami party were appointed to government posts to ensure the continuation of his agenda after his passing. Conservative ulama (Islamic scholars) were added to the Council of Islamic Ideology. Separate electorates for Hindus and Christians were established in 1985 even though Christian and Hindu leaders complained that they felt excluded from the county's political process.

Zia's state sponsored Islamization increased sectarian divisions in Pakistan between Sunnis and Shias and between Deobandis and Barelvis. A solid majority of Barelvis had supported the creation of Pakistan, and Barelvi ulama had also issued fatwas in support of the Pakistan Movement during the 1946 elections, but ironically Islamic state politics in Pakistan was mostly in favour of Deobandi (and later Ahl-e-Hadith/Salafi) institutions. This was despite the fact that only a few (although influential) Deobandi clerics had supported the Pakistan Movement. Zia-ul-Haq forged a strong alliance between the military and Deobandi institutions. In Pakistan, actors who have been identified by the state as moderate Sufis—such as the Barelwis, a movement founded in the 19th century in response to conservative reformers such as the Deobandis—mobilized after the government’s call from 2009 onwards to save the soul of Pakistan from creeping “Talibanization.”

Possible motivations for the Islamization programme included Zia's personal piety (most accounts agree that he came from a religious family), desire to gain political allies, to "fulfill Pakistan's raison d'être" as a Muslim state, and/or the political need to legitimise what was seen by some Pakistanis as his "repressive, un-representative martial law regime".

Until the government of General Muhammad Zia-ul-Haq, "Islamic activists" were frustrated by the lack of "teeth" to enforce Islamic law in Pakistan's constitution. For example, in the 1956 constitution, the state did not enforce "Islamic moral standards" but "endeavor[ed]" to make them compulsory and to "prevent" prostitution, gambling, consumption of alcoholic liquor, etc. Interest was to be eliminated "as soon as possible".

According to Shajeel Zaidi a million people attended Zia ul Haq's funeral because he had given them what they wanted: more religion. A PEW opinion poll found that 84% of Pakistanis favoured making Sharia the official law of the land. According to the 2013 Pew Research Center report, the majority of Pakistani Muslims also support the death penalty for those who leave Islam (62%). In contrast, support for the death penalty for those who leave Islam was only 36% in fellow South Asian Muslim country Bangladesh (which shared heritage with Pakistan). A 2010 opinion poll by PEW Research Centre also found that 87% of Pakistanis considered themselves 'Muslims first' rather than a member of their nationality. This was the highest figure amongst all Muslim populations surveyed. In contrast only 67% in Jordan, 59% in Egypt, 51% in Turkey, 36% in Indonesia and 71% in Nigeria considered themselves as 'Muslim first' rather than a member of their own nationality.

"Islamic activists" such as much or the ulama (Islamic clerics) and Jamaat-e-Islami (Islamist party), support the expansion of "Islamic law and Islamic practices".  "Islamic Modernists" are lukewarm to this expansion and "some may even advocate development along the secularist lines of the West."

Islamic way of life
The mosque is an important religious as well as social institution in Pakistan. Many rituals and ceremonies are celebrated according to Islamic calendar.

Muslim fiqhs in Pakistan

According to the CIA World Factbook and Oxford Centre for Islamic Studies, 95-97% of the total population of Pakistan is Muslim.

Sunni
The majority of the Pakistani Muslims belong to the Sunni Islam. Estimates on the Sunni population in Pakistan range from 85% to 90%.

Shia

Shia Ithna 'ashariyah in Pakistan are estimated to be 6% of the total population.

6% of Pakistani Muslims surveyed self-identify as Shias, is the one exception to this rule. Pakistan’s Sunnis are more mixed in their attitudes toward Shias half say they are Muslims, while 41% disagree.

On the other hand, in Pakistan, where 2% of the survey respondents identify as Shia, Sunni attitudes are more mixed: 50% say Shias are Muslims, while 41% say they are not.

Shias allege discrimination by the Pakistani government since 1948, claiming that Sunnis are given preference in business, official positions and administration of justice. Attacks on Shias increased under the presidency of Zia-ul-Haq, with the first major sectarian riots in Pakistan breaking out in 1983 in Karachi and later spreading to Lahore and Baluchistan. Sectarian violence became a recurring feature of the Muharram month every year, with sectarian violence between Sunnis and Shias taking place in 1986 in Parachinar. In one notorious incident, the 1988 Gilgit Massacre, Osama bin Laden-led Sunni tribals assaulted, massacred and raped Shia civilians in Gilgit after being inducted by the Pakistan Army to quell a Shia uprising in Gilgit.

Since 2008 thousands of Shia have been killed by Sunni extremists according to Human Rights Watch (HRW).

Sufism

Sufism is a vast term and many Sufi orders exist within Pakistan where the philosophy has a strong tradition. Historically, the Sufi missionaries had played a pivotal role in converting the native peoples of Punjab and Sindh to Islam. The most notable Muslim Sufi orders in Pakistan are the Qadiriyya, Naqshbandiya, Chishtiya and Suhrawardiyya silsas (Muslim Orders) and they have a large amount of devotees in Pakistan. The tradition of visiting dargahs is still practiced today.  Sufis whose shrines receive much national attention are Data Ganj Baksh (Ali Hajweri) in Lahore (ca. 11th century), Sultan Bahoo in Shorkot Jhang, Baha-ud-din Zakariya in Multan, and Shahbaz Qalander in Sehwan (ca. 12th century) and Shah Abdul Latif Bhitai in Bhit, Sindh and Rehman Baba in Khyber Pakhtunkhwa Province. The Urs (death anniversary) of Sufi saints accounts for the largest gathering upon their shrines held annually by the devotees.

Although, popular Sufi culture is centered on Thursday night gatherings at shrines and annual festivals which feature Sufi music and dance, certain tariqas such as Sarwari Qadri Order, refrain from such traditions and believe in paying visit to the shrines, making prayers or reciting manqabat. Moreover, contemporary Islamic fundamentalists also criticize the popular tradition of singing, dance and music, which in their view, does not accurately reflect the teachings and practice of Mohammad and his companions. There have been terrorist attacks directed at Sufi shrines and festivals, five in 2010 that killed 64 people. Presently, the known tariqas in Pakistan have maintained their organisations usually known as tehreeks and have their khanqahs for the dhikr of Allah, as per the old age Sufi tradition.

Quranists
Muslims who reject the authority of hadith, known as Quranist, Quraniyoon, or Ahle Quran, are also present in Pakistan. The largest Quranist organization in Pakistan is Ahle Quran, followed by Bazm-e-Tolu-e-Islam. Another Quranist movement in Pakistan is Ahlu Zikr.

Nondenominational
Roughly twelve per cent of Pakistani Muslims self-describe or have beliefs overlapping with non-denominational Muslims. These Muslims have beliefs that by and large overlap with those of the majority of Muslims and the difference in their prayers are usually non-existent or negligible. Nonetheless, in censuses asking for a clarification on which strand or rite of Muslim faith they most closely align, they usually answer "just a Muslim".

Controversies

Apostasy 

A survey based on face-to-face interviews conducted in 80 languages by the Pew Research Center between 2008 and 2012 among thousands of Muslims in many countries, found varied views on the death penalty for those who leave Islam to become an atheist or to convert to another religion. In Pakistan 76% of respondents support the death penalty for apostasy from Islam.

Blasphemy 

The Pakistan Penal Code, the main criminal code of Pakistan, punishes blasphemy against any recognized religion, providing penalties ranging from a fine to death. From 1967 to 2014, over 1,300 people have been accused of blasphemy, with Muslims constituting most of those accused.

Pakistan inherited blasphemy laws enacted by British colonial authorities and made them more severe between 1980 and 1986, when a number of clauses were added by the military government of General Zia-ul Haq, in order to "Islamicise" the laws and deny the Muslim character of the Ahmadi minority. Before 1986, only 14 cases of blasphemy were reported. Parliament through the Second Amendment to the Constitution on 7 September 1974, under Prime Minister Zulfiqar Ali Bhutto, declared Ahmadi Muslims as non-Muslims. In 1986 it was supplemented by a new blasphemy provision also applied to Ahmadi Muslims (See Persecution of Ahmadis). Between 1987 and 2017 at least 1,500 people were charged with blasphemy and at least 75 people involved in accusations of blasphemy were killed in Pakistan according to the Center for Social Justice.

Many people accused of blasphemy have been murdered before their trials were over, and prominent figures who opposed the blasphemy law have been assassinated.
Since 1990, 62 people have been murdered following blasphemy allegations. According to one religious minority source, an accusation of blasphemy commonly exposes the accused, police, lawyers, and judges to harassment, threats, attacks and rioting. Critics complain that Pakistan's blasphemy laws are "overwhelmingly being used to persecute religious minorities and settle personal vendettas," but calls for change in blasphemy laws have been strongly resisted by Islamic parties - most prominently the Barelvi school of Islam. Many atheists in Pakistan have been lynched and imprisoned over unsubstantiated allegations of blasphemy. When the state initiated a full-fledged crackdown on atheism since 2017, it has become worse with secular bloggers being kidnapped and the government running advertisements urging people to identify blasphemers among them and the highest judges declaring such people to be terrorists.

Cases under blasphemy law have also been registered against Muslims who have harassed non-Muslims.

In 2020, the European Foundation for South Asian Studies (EFSAS) in a report entitled, Guilty until proven innocent: The sacrilegious nature of blasphemy laws Pakistan, recommended wide-ranging changes to Pakistan's laws and legal systems.

Conversions

There have been conversions to Islam from the religious minorities of Pakistan. Baba Deen Mohammad Shaikh, a former Hindu, is a Muslim missionary from Matli in Badin District of Sindh province claim that he has converted over 110,000 Hindus to Islam.

The Human Rights Council of Pakistan has reported that cases of forced conversion to Islam are increasing. A 2014 report by the Movement for Solidarity and Peace (MSP) says about 1,000 women in Pakistan are forcibly converted to Islam every year (700 Christian and 300 Hindu). Many Hindu girls living in Pakistan are kidnapped, forcibly converted and married to Muslims. Within Pakistan, the province of the southern Sindh had over 1,000 forced conversions of Christian and Hindu girls according to the annual report of the Human Rights Commission of Pakistan in 2018. According to victims' families and activists, Mian Abdul Haq, who is a local political and religious leader in Sindh, has been accused of being responsible for forced conversions of girls within the province. Sikhs in Hangu district stated they were being pressured to convert to Islam by Yaqoob Khan, the assistant commissioner of Tall Tehsil, in December 2017.

There are Christian missionaries active in Pakistan trying to convert Muslims. The Daily Pakistan in 2017 reported that the South Korean missionaries are involved in evangelising in Muslim countries like Pakistan. In 2014, four Christian missionaries were arrested for distributing Christian pamphlets in the Mirpurkhas in Sindh. In 2017, a Christian missionary couple sent by the British Pakistani Christian Association on a missionary trip to Pakistan was forced to leave Pakistan. In 2017, two Christian missionaries preaching in Pakistan were killed by militants. A 2015 study, estimated 5,500 Muslims converted to Christianity in Pakistan.

Islamic fundamentalism
Despite the recent rise in the Taliban's influence in Pakistan, a poll conducted by Terror Free Tomorrow in Pakistan in January 2008 tested support for al-Qaeda, the Taliban, other militant Islamist groups and Osama bin Laden himself, and found a recent drop by half. In August 2007, 33% of Pakistanis expressed support for al-Qaeda; 38% supported the Taliban. By January 2008, al-Qaeda's support had dropped to 18%, the Taliban's to 19%. When asked if they would vote for al-Qaeda, just 1% of Pakistanis polled answered in the affirmative. The Taliban had the support of 3% of those polled.

Pew Research surveys in 2008, show that in a range of countries—Jordan, Pakistan, Indonesia, Lebanon, and Bangladesh—there have been substantial declines in the percentages saying suicide-bombings and other forms of violence against civilian targets can be justified to defend Islam against its enemies. Wide majorities say such attacks are, at most, rarely acceptable. In Pakistan 86% of respondents agree that terrorist attacks are "never justified".

Gallery

See also

 Baad (practice)
 Blasphemy law in Pakistan
 Freedom of religion in Pakistan
 History of the Islamic Republic of Pakistan
 Islam in South Asia
 Islamization in Pakistan
 Jamaat-e-Islami Pakistan
 Religion in Pakistan
 Religious discrimination in Pakistan
 Shia Islam in Pakistan
 Destruction of Kashmiri Shias
 Sufism in Pakistan
 Sufism in Sindh
 Vani (custom)
 Islam in Bangladesh
 Islam in India
 Islam in South Asia
 Islam by country

References

Further reading
 
 Raja, Masood Ashraf. Constructing Pakistan: Foundational Texts and the Rise of Muslim National Identity, 1857–1947, Oxford 2010, 
 Zaman, Muhammad Qasim. Islam in Pakistan: A History (Princeton UP, 2018) online review

 
Law of Pakistan
History of Islam in Pakistan
Islam-related lists
Islam in Asia
Islam in Asia by country